National Simultaneous Storytime is an annual event held since 2000 by the Australian Library and Information Association. Every year a picture book, by an Australian children's author and illustrator is read simultaneously in libraries, schools, pre-schools, childcare centres, family homes and bookshops around Australia, as part of Australia's Library and Information Week. In 2018 over 1,062,230 participants at over 8,255 locations across Australia took part in National Simultaneous Storytime.

History 
The idea for a national simultaneous event followed a successful Statewide Storytime programme in Victoria in 2000. From 2002 – 2007 NSS took place during National Literacy and Numeracy Week in September. In 2008 it returned to being celebrated on the Wednesday of Australia's Library and Information Week at the end of May. In 2015 over 500,000 children at over 3,100 locations across Australia took part in National Simultaneous Storytime.

Titles 
This table lists the titles, authors and publishers of the selected picture book for each year of National Simultaneous Storytime.

References

External links 
Official Website

Australian Library and Information Association
Annual events in Australia
2000 establishments in Australia
Education in Australia
May events